Medvedevskaya is a rural locality (a village) in Porozhskoye Rural Settlement of Onezhsky District, Arkhangelsk Oblast, Russia. The population was 18 as of 2010.

Geography 
Medvedevskaya is located on the Onega River, 17 km southeast of Onega (the district's administrative centre) by road. Amosovskaya is the nearest rural locality.

References 

Rural localities in Onezhsky District
Onezhsky Uyezd